Geophilus bipartitus is a species of soil centipede in the family Geophilidae found in Japan. It grows up to 15 millimeters in length; the males have about 35 leg pairs, the females 39. It lives in Japanese white birch.

References

bipartitus
Animals described in 1937
Arthropods of Japan

Zoology